Ashley Avery Ambrose (born September 17, 1970) is a former professional American football cornerback for several NFL teams during the 1990s and early 2000s who most recently served as the cornerbacks coach at the University of Colorado.

Ambrose was hired as a defensive technical intern for the Colorado football team's 2008 season. In May 2009, head coach Dan Hawkins announced that Ambrose would take over as the wide receivers coach in 2010, but after the departure of Greg Brown, Ambrose took over the defensive backs. From 2011 to 2012, he was the secondary coach at University of California, Berkeley.  In 2013, he spent the season with the New Orleans Saints in the NFL as a minority intern.  In 2014, he coached cornerbacks at the University of Idaho and moved on to Texas State University in 2015 before being hired by Boise State University in January 2016.

References

1970 births
American Conference Pro Bowl players
American football cornerbacks
Atlanta Falcons players
Boise State Broncos football coaches
California Golden Bears football coaches
Cincinnati Bengals players
coaches of American football from Louisiana
Colorado Buffaloes football coaches
Idaho Vandals football coaches
Indianapolis Colts players
living people
Mississippi Valley State Delta Devils football players
New Orleans Saints players
Players of American football from New Orleans
Texas State Bobcats football coaches